María Dolores is a 1953 Spanish drama film directed by José María Elorrieta.

Cast
 Mariano Alcón 
 Rafael Cortés 
 Francisco Cossío hijo
 Ignacio Coy 
 Beni Deus 
 José Escanero 
 Ana Esmeralda 
 Gonzalo Guillén
 Casimiro Hurtado 
 Aurelio Lasala
 José María Martín
 José Manuel Meana  
 Miguel Milá
 Fernando Nogueras
 Alfredo Obarrio 
 Maite Pardo 
 José María Romeo 
 Diana Salcedo 
 Fernando Sancho 
 José María Sevilla 
 Jaime Torremocha

References

Bibliography 
 Francesc Sánchez Barba. Brumas del franquismo: el auge del cine negro español (1950-1965). Edicions Universitat Barcelona, 2007.

External links 
 

1953 films
1953 drama films
Spanish drama films
1950s Spanish-language films
Films directed by José María Elorrieta
Spanish black-and-white films
1950s Spanish films